Olle Hilding (born Hilding Olof Johansson; 19 July 1898  – 9 November 1983) was a Swedish stage and film actor. He appeared in motion pictures between 1923-1982.

Biography
Hilding Olof Johansson was born and died in the Katarina Parish of Stockholm, Sweden.
From 1920–1923 he toured the country with the theater company of  Oscar Winge (1884-1951)  and made his film debut under the direction of film director, Victor Sjöström  (1879–1960) in Vem doer (1922).   During much of the 1930s, Hilding  helped author Erik Lindorm (1889-1941), with his book chronicles, most of which featured historical personalities and events as themes. Hilding returned to the theater in 1940. In 1934 he  married actress Olga Appellöf (1898-1989).
He won the Eugene O'Neill Award in 1973.

Partial filmography

 Johan Ulfstjerna (1923) - Conspirator (uncredited)
 Artificial Svensson (1929) - Soldat (uncredited)
Ulla, My Ulla (1930) - Court Valet (uncredited)
 Cavaliers of the Crown (1930) - Con Man (uncredited)
 Ship Ahoy! (1931) - Waitor (uncredited)
Landskamp (1932) - Member of price committee (uncredited)
 Wife for a Day (1933) - Benjamin
 Fired (1934) - Aron Jacobsky (uncredited)
 Adolf Strongarm (1937) - Henriksson / Henrik Mjölnare
 Good Friends and Faithful Neighbours (1938) - Emil Norling
Då länkarna smiddes (1939) - Forsman
Mot nya tider (1939) - Chess Player (uncredited)
Emilie Högquist (1939) - Dinner Guest (uncredited)
 Heroes in Yellow and Blue (1940) - Courtroom Clerk (uncredited)
Landstormens lilla argbigga (1941) - Private (uncredited)
 Dunungen (1941) - Ehinger
 Dangerous Ways (1942) - Prant's Co-worker (uncredited)
 Adventurer (1942) - Pater Josef
The Word (1943) - Brandeus
Kajan går till sjöss (1943) - Policeman (uncredited)
Excellensen (1944) - Gammal judisk man
 Live Dangerously (1944) - Olof
 My People Are Not Yours (1944) - Caretaker
Som folk är mest (1944) - Lagerchefen (uncredited)
Wandering with the Moon (1945) - Dan's Father (uncredited)
Försök inte med mej..! (1946) - Priest (uncredited)
 Brita in the Merchant's House (1946) - Olsson (uncredited)
Åsa-Hanna (1946) - Efraim
Kristin Commands (1946) - Man at Auction (uncredited)
Det glada kalaset (1946) - Lawyer
 Harald the Stalwart (1946) - Harald's father
Livet i Finnskogarna (1947) - Pregnant girl's father (uncredited)
The Key and the Ring (1947) - Falk
Här kommer vi... (1947) - Teaterchefen (uncredited)
Sin (1948) - Banker
 The Quartet That Split Up (1950) - Thun (uncredited)
Barabbas (1953) - Old Potter at Jerusalem (uncredited)
 The Shadow (1953) - Berggren
 Marianne (1953) - Erik Ekman
 No Man's Woman (1953) - Henriksson, Judith's father (uncredited)
 Café Lunchrasten (1954) - Editor (uncredited)
Seger i mörker (1954) - Bergquist
 Simon the Sinner (1954) - Believer
 Getting Married (1955) - Farm hand (uncredited)
Ratataa eller The Staffan Stolle Story (1956) - Salamander, antikvitetshandlare (uncredited)
 Synnöve Solbakken (1957) - Priest (uncredited)
Värmlänningarna (1957) - Jan Hansson
 Fridolf Stands Up! (1958) - Nilsson
Fly mej en greve (1959) - Violinist (uncredited)
Fridolfs farliga ålder (1959) - Nilsson
Ön (1966) - Persson
The Man Who Quit Smoking (1972) - Sjöström, lawyer
En enkel melodi (1974)
Långt borta och nära (1976) - Old Gesticulating Man
Fanny and Alexander (1982) - Old Clergyman - Ekdahlska huset

References

Other sources

Male actors from Stockholm
1898 births
1983 deaths
Swedish male stage actors
Swedish male film actors
Swedish male silent film actors
20th-century Swedish male actors
Eugene O'Neill Award winners